Doro Merande (born Dora Matthews, March 31, 1892 – November 1, 1975) was an  American actress who appeared in film, theater, and television.

Early years
 
Born in Columbus, Kansas, as Dora Matthews, she was the daughter of a minister.  At age 18, while living with her family in Kansas City, Missouri, she worked as a music teacher. She later headed to New York City to become an actress.

Stage actress
Merande found her first part in a small summer company in Massachusetts. She coveted Broadway parts during the Great Depression. Her career began with the Jules Levanthal Company. 

She appeared on Broadway using her birth name in That Ferguson Family (1928) and Montmartreas (1922). Her first Broadway appearance as Doro Merande was as "Sophie Tuttle" in Loose Moments in 1935. Soon she was cast in One Good Year, Red Harvest, and Angel Island. Her first major stage role was playing the gossip in Our Town by Thornton Wilder repeating her performance in the 1940 film. Merande later appeared with Leo G. Carroll in Lo and Behold, The Rat Race with Betty Field, and in The Silver Whistle, with Jose Ferrer. She performed with Clifton Webb (in Mr. Belvedere Rings The Bell), Walter Huston (in Apple of His Eye), and Franchot Tone (in Hope for Your Best). 

Her final Broadway appearance was in the 1969 revival of The Front Page, in which she portrayed the cleaning woman, as she later also did in the 1970 television and the 1974 film version. The 1974 film version was her final appearance; she was directed by Billy Wilder, with whom she had previously worked in the films The Seven Year Itch (1955) and Kiss Me, Stupid (1964).

Filmography
Merande appeared onscreen in bit parts starting in the early 1930s and had her first substantial role in 1940, reprising her role as the gossip in the film adaptation of Our Town.

Films

 Interference (1928) - Deborah's Maid (uncredited)
 Personal Maid (1931) - Mrs. Wurtz's Maid (uncredited)
 Wayward (1932) - Maid (uncredited)
 State Fair (1933) - Mrs. Metcalfe's Acquaintance at Food Contest (uncredited)
 Bondage (1933) - Boarding House Matron (uncredited)
 Zoo in Budapest (1933) - Miss Fennock - Orphanage Assistant (uncredited)
 Moonlight and Pretzels (1933) - Hymn-singing Lady (uncredited)
 Navy Wife (1935) - Nurse Sharpe (uncredited)
 Bad Boy (1935) - Mrs. Jackson (uncredited)
 The Star Maker (1939) - Gerry Society Woman
 Our Town (1940) - Mrs. Soames
 The Snake Pit (1948) - Inmate, First Lady of the Land (uncredited)
 Cover Up (1949) - Hilda
 Mr. Belvedere Rings the Bell (1951) - Mrs. Hammer
 The Whistle at Eaton Falls (1951) - Miss Pringle
 The Seven Year Itch (1955) - Waitress at Vegetarian Restaurant (uncredited)
 The Man with the Golden Arm (1955) - Vi
 The Remarkable Mr. Pennypacker (1959) - Miss Haskins (uncredited)
 The Gazebo (1959) - Matilda
 The Cardinal (1963) - Woman Picket
 Kiss Me, Stupid (1964) - Mrs. Pettibone
 The Russians Are Coming, the Russians Are Coming (1966) - Muriel Everett
 Hurry Sundown (1967) - Ada Hemmings
 Skidoo (1968) - The Mayor
 Change of Habit (1969) - Rose
 Making It (1971) - Librarian
 The Front Page (1974) - Jennie (final film role)

Television
 Valiant Lady (1953) - Ivy Harper (1956-1957)
 Kraft Television Theater (1953–1954)
 The United States Steel Hour (1957) - Felice
 Steve Canyon (1958) - Mrs. Turtin
 Alfred Hitchcock Presents (Episode: "Mrs. Herman and Mrs. Fenimore", with Mary Astor, 1958) - Mrs. Herman
 The Phil Silvers Show (1959) - Assistant USO Hostess / Mrs. Whitcomb
 Playhouse 90 (1959) - Miss Hammer / Mrs. Adolph
 Bringing Up Buddy (CBS sitcom, 1960–1961) - "Aunt Iris Flower" 
 Thriller (1961) - Melba Pennaroyd
 The Defenders (1962) - Augusta Mills
 Sam Benedict (1963) - Elizabeth Campbell
 The Twilight Zone (1963, Episode: "The Bard") - Sadie
 That Was the Week That Was (TW3)  (NBC satirical revue, 1964; she appeared in numerous episodes, notably with Margaret Hamilton as quirky New Hampshire voters during the year's presidential election campaign.)
 The Jackie Gleason Show (1966–1970) - Emma Beauregard

Death
Merande was scheduled to play the mother-in-law of Jackie Gleason's character Ralph Kramden in The Honeymooners 25th anniversary television special. On November 1, 1976, she died of a stroke at the age of 83 at Jackson Memorial Hospital in Miami, Florida. Templeton Fox took over the role.

References

External links
 
 
 

1892 births
1975 deaths
Actresses from Kansas
Actresses from Michigan
American film actresses
American stage actresses
American television actresses
People from Columbus, Kansas
Vaudeville performers
20th-century American actresses